Robert II, Archbishop of Rouen (bef. 989–1037), and Count of Évreux was a powerful and influential prelate, and a family member of and supporter of five dukes of Normandy.

Life
Robert was a son of Richard I, Duke of Normandy and his second wife, Gunnor. He was a younger brother of duke Richard II and uncle of duke Robert I.
He had been appointed Archbishop of Rouen by his father  and had been given the countship of Évreux at the same time. Robert was well aware he was destined for the church and seemingly accepted his role as both archbishop and count willingly. But he had always been involved in Norman politics and was a powerful adherent of the Norman dukes. Robert had proved himself a powerful ecclesiastical ally of his father, Richard I, as well as his brother, Richard II, and at the latter's death effectively became the senior male adviser to the ducal clan. But his nephew Richard III had a turbulent and short reign of just over a year and when replaced by his brother Robert I, as Duke of Normandy, the prelate Robert had a great deal of trouble restraining the new duke. In 1028 he found himself besieged and then banished by his young nephew. Duke Robert I then besieged Hugh d'Ivry, Bishop of Bayeux who, along with Archbishop Robert had apparently questioned his authority as duke. From exile in France, Archbishop Robert excommunicated his nephew Duke Robert and placed Normandy under an interdict.

The Archbishop and Duke finally came to terms and to facilitate the lifting of the interdict and excommunication, Duke Robert restored the Archbishop to his see, to his countship of Evereux, and returned all his properties. To further illustrate his change of heart towards the church, Duke Robert restored property that he or his vassals had confiscated, and by 1034 had returned all church properties including those taken from Fécamp Abbey. By 1033 Duke Robert was mounting a major campaign against his double cousin Alan III, Duke of Brittany. He and Alan had been raiding back and forth but finally a peace was negotiated between them by the returned Archbishop Robert, their mutual uncle.

In his last years Robert, realizing his past mistakes, began giving freely to the poor and undertook to rebuild the cathedral church at Rouen. In 1035 Duke Robert had decided on a pilgrimage to Jerusalem. After making his illegitimate son, the future William the Conqueror his heir and arranging for the archbishop to watch over and protect young William, Duke Robert set out on his pilgrimage never to return to Normandy. Archbishop Robert fulfilled his promise and effectively ruled Normandy as regent for William until Robert's death in 1037, which almost immediately caused an increase in lawlessness in Normandy. His title of Archbishop of Rouen was succeeded by his nephew, Mauger.

Orderic Vitalis relates of a richly illustrated great psalter given to Archbishop Robert by his sister Queen Emma, wife of king Æthelred. In a catalog of books in the Cathedral of Rouen created during the twelfth century, a reference was found to a particular book, the Benedictionarius Roberti archiepiscopi, which was given to the church of Rouen by Archbishop Robert of Normandy. Since that time it became the property of the city of Rouen, where it is preserved (No. 27) as the Benedictional of Æthelgar, possibly for the prayers it contained at the end for the coronation of the Anglo-Saxon kings and queens.

Robert was the recipient of two epistolary poems from Warner of Rouen, who describes himself as the bishop's "servant" (famulus).

Family
Robert married Herlevea, and they had several children including the following:

 Richard, Count of Évreux (d. 1067)
 Ralph d'Évreux, Seigneur of Gacé. He married Basilla Flaitel, daughter of Gerard Flaitel.  They had one son, Robert d'Évreux, who died without heirs. Basilla married secondly, Hugh de Gournay.
 William d'Évreux, married Hawise de Échauffour, daughter of Giroie, Lord of Échauffour, and had a daughter, Judith d'Évreux, who married Roger I of Sicily.
 Hugh De Lacy, married to Emma De Lacy. They had multiple children.

Notes

References

10th-century archbishops
11th-century archbishops
Archbishops of Rouen
Counts of Évreux
House of Normandy
1037 deaths
10th-century births
11th-century Normans